Qızılqaya (known as Yenikənd until 2015) is a village in the Gadabay Rayon of Azerbaijan.  The village forms part of the municipality of Çobankənd.

References 

Populated places in Gadabay District